Boris Arkadyevich Kopeykin (born 27 March 1946 in Chelyabinsk) is a retired Soviet football player and a current Russian coach.

Honours
 Soviet Top League winner: 1970.
 Top 33 players year-end list: three times.

International career
Kopeykin made his debut for USSR on 28 October 1970 in a friendly against Bulgaria. He played in the UEFA Euro 1972 qualifiers, but was not selected for the final tournament squad.

References
  Profile

1946 births
Living people
Soviet footballers
PFC CSKA Moscow players
Soviet Union international footballers
Soviet football managers
Russian football managers
PFC CSKA Moscow managers
FC Asmaral Moscow managers
Russian Premier League managers
FC SKA-Khabarovsk players
Soviet Top League players
Honoured Coaches of Russia
Association football forwards